Yunlong Lake is a lake in Xuzhou, Jiangsu, China. Yunlong Mountain lies to its east.

Tourism 

Since 2016, it is classified as a AAAAA scenic area by the China National Tourism Administration. The scenic area contains ancient-style bridges and buildings.

Ecology 

The lake and its surroundings contain peach, willow, plum, and red maple trees. The lake also contains lotus plants.

References

Tourist attractions in Jiangsu
Lakes of China
AAAAA-rated tourist attractions